The 2021 Giro d'Italia is the 104th edition of the Giro d'Italia, one of cycling's Grand Tours. The Giro began in Torino with an individual time trial on 8 May, and Stage 11 occurred on 19 May with a stage to Montalcino. The race finished in Milan on 30 May.

Classification standings

Stage 1 
8 May 2021 — Torino to Torino,  (ITT)

For the fourth year in succession, the Giro started with a short individual time trial. This year, the Giro started with an  test against the clock in Torino. The course was flat all the way through, which meant that the power riders were widely considered as the favourites for the stage victory.

The early benchmark time was set by 's David Dekker, the second rider to start, who completed the course in a time of 9' 19". Shortly thereafter, Jonathan Castroviejo beat his time by 5 seconds to move into the hot seat, until Matthias Brändle set a time of 9' 10". However, his teammate Edoardo Affini broke the 9-minute barrier and blitzed the course in a time of 8' 57". He stayed at the hot seat for a long time before the time trial world champion, Filippo Ganna, rode the course as one of the last riders to go down the start ramp. It was enough to get him the stage victory and the first maglia rosa for the second year in succession; in doing so, Ganna would also be the first leader of the points and young rider classifications.

In terms of the GC, last year's revelation, João Almeida, was the best of the favorites, finishing 4th with a time of 9' 04". His teammate, Remco Evenepoel, who was riding his first race since his crash at last year's Il Lombardia, finished 7th with a time of 9' 06". Another GC contender who set a fast time was Aleksandr Vlasov, who finished 11th with a time of 9' 11", while many of the other main GC contenders were clustered around 35 to 40 seconds back of Ganna.

After Krists Neilands completed his time trial, he crashed while riding back to the team hotel and fractured his collarbone. As a result, the Latvian was forced to withdraw from the race, being the first rider to do so.

Stage 2 
9 May 2021 — Stupinigi (Nichelino) to Novara, 

The first road stage of the Giro featured a flat stage from Stupinigi to Novara.

This stage was also notable for being held on the 10th anniversary of the death of Belgian rider Wouter Weylandt, who died following a crash on Stage 3 of the 2011 edition. A moment of silence was held in Weylandt's memory prior to the start of the day's race.

A three-man breakaway broke clear as soon as the flag dropped. The break, composed of Vincenzo Albanese, Umberto Marengo, and Filippo Tagliani were allowed to build up a gap of 4' 20" before the peloton began to bring them back. On the only categorized climb of the day up to Montechiaro d'Asti, it was Albanese who took the points to become the first wearer of the blue mountains jersey before his time on the front ended due to a mechanical. With  to go, Tagliani and Marengo dueled for the first intermediate sprint in Tricerro, which the former won to take maximum points, before Fernando Gaviria took third a few minutes later from the peloton. Race leader Filippo Ganna took the maximum of three bonus seconds to extend his lead, while Remco Evenepoel took two bonus seconds to move ahead of his teammate João Almeida into 4th place in GC.

In the final kilometers, the sprinters and their respective lead-out trains crowded the front of the peloton in preparation for the sprint while the GC teams fought for position at the front to keep their leaders safe. In the final kilometer, there was no clear lead-out train and it was Tim Merlier of Giro debutant team  who started his sprint with 200 meters to go. He would not be overtaken as he took the stage and the points jersey in the process. Giacomo Nizzolo finished second with Elia Viviani taking third. Dylan Groenewegen, who was riding his first race following a nine-month suspension, finished fourth. Ganna finished safely in the peloton to keep the maglia rosa.

Stage 3 
10 May 2021 — Biella to Canale, 

The third stage featured a hilly course from Biella to Canale. While the first  were mostly flat, the final part of the stage featured one third-category climb and two fourth-category climbs. In addition, there was an uncategorized steep climb up to Guarene, which topped with  left and offered bonus seconds instead of mountains classification points, before a mostly flat run-in to the finish. 

The stage began with heavy rain, which gradually let up by the midpoint of the stage. Initially, a seven-man group, including mountains classification leader Vincenzo Albanese and frequent breakaway participant Simon Pellaud, went off the front before Pellaud's 18-year-old teammate Andrii Ponomar joined the break following a 10-kilometer chase. The breakaway was allowed a gap of around six minutes before  began to close the gap for their sprinter, Peter Sagan. At the first intermediate sprint in Canelli, won by Pellaud, before the day's climbs, the gap was reduced to under four minutes. On the first and second climbs, Vincenzo Albanese took first place to extend his lead in the mountains competition, while also managing to snap a single point by placing third on the third climb. Back in the peloton,  continued their fast pace and began to shed most of the sprinters on the second climb in an attempt to eliminate Sagan's rivals for stage victory. The pace of the peloton meant that the breakaway's lead was reduced to just a minute and a half following the last categorized climb.

As the break took on the final uncategorized climb, Pellaud attacked his breakaway companions, with only Taco van der Hoorn and Samuele Zoccarato able to follow his acceleration. Near the top, Zoccarato was dropped as the duo's lead hovered around 30 seconds. From behind, Giulio Ciccone and Tony Gallopin attacked in an attempt to bridge up to the break, but they were unable to close the gap before being reined back in. With  to go and the lead hovering around 40 seconds, van der Hoorn dropped Pellaud. Davide Cimolai led the peloton home four seconds later just ahead of Sagan in third, while race leader Filippo Ganna finished with the peloton to hold on to the maglia rosa.

Stage 4 
11 May 2021 — Piacenza to Sestola, 

The fourth stage took on a hilly route from Piacenza to Sestola. The first  were mostly flat, followed by a series of hills, before the peloton began to tackle to first of the day's climbs, a third-category hill up to Castello di Carpineti. After that climb, riders descended into the valley before tackling the second third-category climb to Montemolino and then another uncategorized climb. The finale featured an intermediate sprint for bonus seconds in Fanano at the foot of the second-category climb of Colle Passerino, which averaged almost 10 percent across  and included pitches of up to 16 percent.

Much like the previous day, the peloton encountered heavy rain which persisted for much of the day. The first attacks were made by the Belgian duo of Quinten Hermans and Victor Campenaerts. Several riders continued to attack from the peloton until 25 riders comprised the day's breakaway. The peloton immediately let the break increase their advantage to around 5 minutes before race leader Filippo Ganna took to the front of the peloton. As the break neared the top of the first third-category climb at Castello di Carpineti, Francesco Gavazzi attacked, taking the maximum points to defend teammate Vincenzo Albanese's lead in the mountains classification, while a Christopher Juul-Jensen and the  duo of Hermans and Rein Taaramäe pressed on after the climb in pursuit of the stage win. The trio extended their lead to almost two minutes over the rest of the break, putting Taaramäe in a position to possibly take the maglia rosa at the end of the day. Taaramäe attacked near the top of the second climb, with Juul-Jensen following his move. The duo stayed away for much of the day until Alessandro De Marchi and Joe Dombrowski caught up to and passed them on the final climb. De Marchi crossed the line 13 seconds down but finished fast enough to take over the maglia rosa and the race lead.

From behind, the peloton containing the GC contenders remained calm, with Ganna setting the tempo until he was dropped on the second climb. On the final climb of Colle Passerino, 's co-leader João Almeida was dropped; he eventually lost more than four minutes to the other contenders. Near the top, Mikel Landa and Giulio Ciccone attacked before being followed by Egan Bernal, Aleksandr Vlasov, and Hugh Carthy shortly thereafter. The quintet eventually stayed away to finish 11 seconds ahead a seven-man chase group which included Remco Evenepoel, Simon Yates, Romain Bardet and Dan Martin. Meanwhile, a group containing last year's runner up, Jai Hindley, Vincenzo Nibali, and Emanuel Buchmann lost 34 seconds while George Bennett lost almost a minute and a half.

Stage 5 
12 May 2021 — Modena to Cattolica, 

The fifth stage featured a pan-flat route from Modena to Cattolica. There were two intermediate sprints after  in Imola and after  in Savignano sul Rubicone. After rain persisted for much of the previous two days, sunny skies greeted the riders for the day.

After the flag dropped, Filippo Tagliani and Umberto Marengo attacked out of the peloton. The duo was allowed a lead of five minutes before the peloton began to chase. The duo was allowed to build a gap of almost a minute and a half before the peloton began to close them down. With  to go, Alexis Gougeard attacked from the peloton and eventually bridged across to the lead duo, but the peloton was already closing in on the break. Stage 2 winner and points classification leader Tim Merlier tried to sprint but he dropped his chain, dropping him out of contention for the win. European and Italian road champion Giacomo Nizzolo started his sprint first but Caleb Ewan came from behind to outsprint Nizzolo for the win. With the second place, Nizzolo accrued enough points to gain the lead in the points classification and take the maglia ciclamino.

Several crashes marred the finale of the day's stage, which featured five sharp 90 degree turns in the final . However, most of these crashes occurred before then, meaning that none of the crash victims could benefit from the safety of the three-kilometer rule. Shortly after Gougeard's attack, Tejay van Garderen, near the back of the peloton, got squeezed against the barriers as the peloton navigated a tight turn and had to stop and remount. With  to go, Pavel Sivakov went down after getting squeezed and colliding with a tree. Though he appeared to be in serious pain, he eventually resumed riding, but by finishing last on the stage and losing over 13 minutes, his GC hopes were all but over. After the stage, medical scans revealed a possible fractured collarbone, forcing Sivakov to abandon the race. As the peloton rode past a traffic island, the previous day's winner and mountains classification leader Joe Dombrowski collided with the marshal signalling the island, bringing both people down. In the chain reaction, François Bidard and GC favorite Mikel Landa also crashed heavily. All three riders remained on the ground in noticeable pain for an extended period of time, and while Bidard and Dombrowski were able to get up and ride to the finish, Landa remained on the ground, surrounded by several of his teammates who had stayed behind to help. Eventually, Landa had to abandon the race and was taken in a stretcher off to a local hospital, where he was diagnosed with a broken collarbone and broken ribs.

Stage 6 
13 May 2021 — Grotte di Frasassi to Ascoli Piceno (San Giacomo), 

The riders tackled the first summit finish of the race on stage six, with the course finishing in atop the climb of San Giacomo. The first  gradually went uphill, with an intermediate sprint in Pieve Torina along the way to the base of the first categorized climb, that being the second-category Forca di Gualdo. The third-category climb of the Forca di Presta followed in quick succession before riders faced a long  descent to the foot of San Giacomo, where there was an intermediate sprint offering bonus seconds in Ascoli Piceno. The first  of the climb averaged between five and six percent but the final  averaged 7.5 percent. Following their crashes towards the end of the previous day's stage, François Bidard, who broke his collarbone, and Joe Dombrowski, who was diagnosed with a concussion, abandoned the race before the start of the stage.

Several riders went clear during the first kilometres but  were able to control the initial breakaway. The eight-rider break were allowed to build an advantage of around five and a half minutes. At this point, the rain began to fall down heavily. Around  into the stage, Manuel Belletti crashed; the accumulation of this crash, a crash on stage 3, and a crash in the Presidential Tour of Turkey almost a month prior finally took their toll on him and forced his abandonment. On the long descent towards the final climb, a trio of Romain Bardet, Alberto Bettiol, and Giulio Ciccone broke away from the peloton but their escape was short-lived, as the peloton eventually recollected them before they reached Ascoli Piceno at the foot of the San Giacomo climb.

On the final climb, Ganna continued to press on the pace, dropping George Bennett in the process before cracking himself. At around the same time, Gino Mäder attacked from the break. From behind,  leader Egan Bernal lit up the race with a series of accelerations to whittle down the GC group, with only Ciccone, Remco Evenepoel, and Dan Martin able to follow his move. Despite the GC favorites closing in on Mäder, he managed to hold on and win the stage, taking his first WorldTour and Grand Tour win in the process after coming up just short exactly two months ago on Stage 7 of Paris–Nice. With the points he accumulated on all three of the days' climbs, Mäder also took the lead in the king of the mountains classification. Just twelve seconds later, Bernal, Evenepoel, and Martin would duke it out for the remaining bonus seconds, with Bernal and Martin taking the six and four bonus seconds, respectively, and Ciccone lagging two seconds behind them. Attila Valter, who started the day in fourth place, finished a further 17 seconds behind the Bernal group to take the maglia rosa and the race lead, with Evenepoel and Bernal less than 20 seconds in arrears. In doing so, Valter became the first Hungarian to wear the maglia rosa in the history of the Giro.

As a  team car tried to pull up alongside an official race car to collect rain jackets left behind from their riders, the  car ran into the back of  rider Pieter Serry, who had just been dropped from the group ahead. Serry managed to escape without injuries before going on to finish the stage. For their roles in the incident,  directeur sportif Gene Bates, who was driving the team car, was expelled from the race by the commissaires, while the team's lead directeur sportif Matt White, who was the passenger in the team car, was fined 2,000 CHF. Following the stage, Bates spoke directly to Serry to apologize for the incident.

Stage 7 
14 May 2021 — Notaresco to Termoli, 

The seventh stage of the race featured another chance for the sprinters, with a  course from Notaresco to Termoli. There were several uncategorized hills within the first half of the stage alongside the stage's lone fourth-category climb up to Chieti. After losing 20 minutes due to several crashes on the previous stage, 's GC contender Domenico Pozzovivo withdrew before the stage due to an elbow injury.

As the flag dropped, a trio of breakaway riders immediately jumped from the peloton. Frequent breakaway members Simon Pellaud and Umberto Marengo were joined by Mark Christian, and they were allowed to establish a maximum lead of around five minutes before the sprinters' teams began to chase. After the trio took the maximum points at the first intermediate sprint, Daniel Oss successfully led out his teammate, Peter Sagan, to take five points for the maglia ciclamino competition. Afterwards, the peloton, paced by Thomas De Gendt, continued to eat into the break's advantage. With  to go, the break was eventually swallowed up. On the 200-metre steep section,  led the peloton to keep their sprinter, Caleb Ewan, in a good position. As the peloton reached the final kilometer, Francesco Gavazzi attacked from the peloton and was immediately tailed by Oss. The duo built up a small gap before they were caught shortly thereafter, at which point Fernando Gaviria made a surprise attack from far out. Ewan calmly closed down the gap to Gaviria before kicking again out of Gaviria's slipstream to win the stage ahead of Davide Cimolai and Tim Merlier. Sagan was well-positioned for the sprint but he clipped the barriers, dropping his chain before eventually finishing 14th on the stage. With his second victory of the race, Ewan gained 50 points, enough to take over the lead in the points classification and to don the maglia ciclamino on the next stage.

Inside the final , one of the main GC favourites, Hugh Carthy, encountered a problem with his saddle, and after he remounted, TV cameras caught him discussing the incident with race commissaires. Carthy initially finished two minutes behind the main peloton, but given that it was a mechanical problem within the last , he was given the same time as Ewan and the lead group that he was riding in before the problem. As a result, Carthy kept his sixth place in the GC, 38 seconds behind Attila Valter, who finished safely in the peloton to keep the maglia rosa ahead of a weekend of mountain stages with uphill finishes.

Stage 8 
15 May 2021 — Foggia to Guardia Sanframondi, 

Stage 8 was the southernmost of this year's Giro, and it took the riders from Foggia to a first-time stage finish in Guardia Sanframondi for the second summit finish of the race. There was an uncategorized climb after  and an intermediate sprint in Campobasso after .

Crosswinds delivered some action at the start of the stage. At one point, 's leader Egan Bernal found himself in a front group with a slight gap on the other favourites, but the move was eventually closed down. As the peloton eased up, a group of eight attacked from the peloton after  to finally form the day's breakaway; among the riders was Fernando Gaviria, who was looking for points in the points competition. Current hour record holder Victor Campenaerts eventually bridged up to the break after a long chase to make it nine out front. As there was no threat to the maglia rosa of Attila Valter, the peloton was content to let the break go, allowing them to build a maximum advantage of around seven and a half minutes. At the first intermediate sprint, Gaviria took maximum points. On the climb of Bocca della Selva, Gaviria attacked, looking to get a head start before the descent. However, he crashed while negotiating a turn on the descent, suffering cuts and bruises in the process, although he was eventually able to bridge back up to the break. On the final climb to Guardia Sanframondi, the break attempted several attacks before an attack from Campenaerts and Giovanni Carboni managed to stick, and they were able to quickly build a gap of around 10 seconds. Alexis Gougeard attempted to bridge to them but he would be brought back by the other remnants of the break. On the climb proper, Campenaerts was dropped by Carboni, while behind, Victor Lafay attacked from the chasing group. He quickly passed Campenaerts and Carboni before soloing to the stage win, his first as a professional. This was also his team's first stage win at the Giro since Stage 17 of the 2010 edition, on which Damien Monier won in a similar fashion from a breakaway atop a summit finish. Second place on the stage went to Francesco Gavazzi, who made a late attack to try and bridge up to Lafay and finished 36 seconds back, while Carboni and Campenaerts faded to fifth and seventh, respectively.

From behind,  was able to take complete control of the peloton. Despite the uphill finish, no contenders attempted to make a move in anticipation of the much tougher stage the next day. Most of favourites finished together almost five minutes behind Lafay, led in by João Almeida. However, in the final kilometre, a crash involving Pello Bilbao and Matteo Fabbro caused a minor split in the group. Because the three-kilometer rule is usually applied flat stages only, this incident was not covered by such an insurance policy. As a result, riders such as Jai Hindley and Louis Vervaeke, who was 5th on GC, that were caught behind the crash lost 11 and 25 seconds, respectively, to the other favourites. Bilbao finished a further five seconds behind Vervaeke to limit his losses, while Fabbro lost an additional three minutes.

Caleb Ewan, who wore the maglia ciclamino as the leader of the points classification, abandoned early on during the stage due to knee pain and in order to prepare for the Tour de France, citing that continuing further would hamper his goal of winning a stage in each of the three Grand Tours in a calendar year. Because of this, Tim Merlier, who was second in the classification behind Ewan, inherited the maglia ciclamino after the stage.

Stage 9 
16 May 2021 — Castel di Sangro to Campo Felice (Rocca di Cambio), 

On Stage 9, the Giro began turning back north as the riders faced the first proper mountain stage of this year's race. Almost right from the start, riders took on the uncategorized Colle della Croce before the second-category Passo Godi, a  climb averaging 4.1 percent.

Before the stage, Tomasz Marczyński abandoned due to lingering long COVID symptoms. On the first uncategorized climb, multiple riders, including stage 6 winner Gino Mäder and stage 8 winner Victor Lafay looked to ignite a breakaway, but to no avail. On the Passo Godi, a group was able to get a gap of around 30 seconds but , having missed the break, rode hard to chase the group. Over the top of the climb, Mäder took maximum points to extend his lead in the mountains classification, while behind, Daniel Martínez and Damiano Caruso attacked from the peloton and eventually bridged across to the front group. On the descent of Passo Godi, a horrific crash in the break happened when Caruso's teammate Matej Mohorič hit a crack in the road and lost his balance, somersaulting over his handlebars and landing on his head; the impact of the crash was great enough that Mohorič's front wheel and fork snapped off the rest of his bike. Though he never lost consciousness and was able to stand up, he abandoned the race upon the advice of race and team doctors; Mohorič would later confirm via Twitter that he escaped with only a minor concussion and no broken bones. The remnants of the initial breakaway were caught just before the next climb. With  into the stage, a 17-man group soon broke away on the Fonte Ciarlotto, constituting the final breakaway of the day. As light rain began to fall, Simon Carr attacked from the break and was joined shortly after by Geoffrey Bouchard. The latter took maximum points at the summit, which was to propel him into the virtual lead of the mountains classification. 

On the final climb of the day, with  left, Bouchard dropped Carr, who drifted back to a chasing trio composed of Koen Bouwman, Bauke Mollema, and Michael Storer. Bouwman attacked his companions in the chasing group and caught Bouchard on the final gravel section just outside of the final kilometer, but their lead had been further reduced to just 22 seconds by Gianni Moscon, who continued to set a fast pace on the front of the GC group for his team leader Egan Bernal. At the back end of the group, however, race leader Attila Valter was finally unable to keep up and was dropped. Bernal then immediately went around Vlasov and countered with an acceleration of his own, with only Giulio Ciccone being able to follow. Remco Evenepoel, who wore the white jersey on behalf of Valter, was caught out of position when Bernal attacked but managed to come back and finish fourth, 10 seconds behind Bernal, while Valter finished 49 seconds down. As a result, Bernal took both the maglia rosa and the maglia bianca, with Evenepoel in second at 15 seconds in arrears and Vlasov in third at 21 seconds behind. The 40 mountains classification points gained by Bernal at the finish vaulted him up the standings with 48 points total, but it was not enough to overtake the 51 points of Bouchard, who donned the maglia azzurra as the mountains classification leader.

During the stage, the race saw two more abandonments.  was further reduced to five riders with the abandonment of Jasper De Buyst, while  lost their second rider, Clément Champoussin, who fell ill and could not continue.

Stage 10 
17 May 2021 — L'Aquila to Foligno, 

The last stage before the first rest day saw the race continue northward from L'Aquila to Foligno, for what was expected to be another opportunity for the sprinters.

Right from the start, the day's breakaway was formed. Simon Pellaud and Umberto Marengo were once again part of the break, as was Samuele Rivi and stage 3 winner Taco van der Hoorn.  missed the initial break attempt, but Kobe Goossens attacked across shortly after to make it a quintet out front. While Goossens and van der Hoorn were content to roll over the intermediate sprint, Marengo, Pellaud, and Rivi had a cagey contest for the points on offer, and Rivi got the better of Marengo while Pellaud settled for third. The break eventually joined back together, but shortly thereafter, they were forced to stop at a closed level crossing to let a train pass. However, because it was a rather quick stoppage, race commissaires deemed it a 'race incident' and the peloton behind were not forced to stop as well in order to maintain the breakaway's advantage, which had already been quite slim but was slashed in half from just under three minutes to around one and a half minutes. On the slopes of the third and last uncategorized climb, Marengo was dropped from the break after an acceleration from Pellaud. Meanwhile, in the peloton behind,  took to the front and ramped up the pace, adopting a similar strategy to what they did on stage 3 in order to drop as many of Peter Sagan's sprint rivals as possible. The main damage was done on the Valico della Somma: as Marengo dropped back to the peloton, several sprinters, including Dylan Groenewegen, maglia ciclamino Tim Merlier, and Giacomo Nizzolo, were among those that could not cope with 's furious pace and were dropped. Giovanni Aleotti, in his debut Giro and Grand Tour, led the  train and the peloton over the summit of the Valico della Somma to take the maximum mountains classification points on offer unchallenged, with teammates Daniel Oss and Emanuel Buchmann sweeping up the rest of the points. Victor Campenaerts had dropped back to try and pace his teammate Nizzolo back up to the peloton, but the duo never managed to chip into their deficit and they eventually resigned themselves to being out of contention for the final sprint.  came to front to help , while  lined up ahead of the second intermediate sprint for team leader Remco Evenepoel to try and take some bonus seconds. Seeing this,  also presented themselves at the front of the peloton, with former race leader Filippo Ganna leading out current race leader Egan Bernal to maintain the latter's 15-second gap over second-placed Evenepoel. Neither GC contender seemed to give the sprint too much effort, but when Bernal's teammate Jhonatan Narváez saw that Bernal would not be able to come around Evenepoel, he let off his own sprint to take the maximum of three bonus seconds, with Evenepoel getting two seconds to Bernal's one to reduce the deficit to 14 seconds.

The crash created a split in the group, leaving only a handful of sprinters left to contest the stage. Juan Sebastián Molano tried to lead it out for his sprinter Fernando Gaviria, but the latter lost the wheel. Sagan, however, took advantage of the mistake, closing down Molano before starting his sprint from a long way out. Despite that, he was able to hold off Gaviria and Davide Cimolai to take his second Giro stage win in as many participations; coincidentally, his first Giro stage win happened to be Stage 10 of last year's Giro. The win garnered Sagan 50 points, which was enough for him to take over the lead in the points classification from Merlier and don the maglia ciclamino. The splits caused by Kanter's crash also saw Aleksandr Vlasov and Marc Soler among those to finish seven seconds behind Sagan and 21 seconds ahead of Bernal, but the three-kilometer rule gave everyone caught behind the crash the same finishing time as Sagan, thereby maintaining the GC standings from the day before.

Rest day 1 
18 May 2021 — Foligno

Stage 11 
19 May 2021 — Perugia to Montalcino, 

The second sector was the first climb of the Passo del Lume Spento, the only categorized climb of the stage, which also featured the first intermediate sprint at Castiglione del Bosco early on into the sector. Following the descent, the riders tackled the last sector on the Passo del Lume Spento, this time being climbed from a different side.

The day's breakaway formed as soon as the flag dropped, with 11 riders going off the front. The break was allowed to reach a maximum of 14 minutes, making it more likely that someone from the break was going to take the stage. The break was fully intact on the first sector, but as they approached the second sector, Roger Kluge and Bert-Jan Lindeman were immediately dropped. Shortly thereafter, Taco van der Hoorn followed suit just before the first intermediate sprint. On the descent leading up to the third sector, all three would eventually make it catch back on, although Lindeman was dropped from the break for good through this sector. On the last sector, with the rest of the break still intact, Dries De Bondt kicked off the hostilities, with Mauro Schmid and Alessandro Covi joining him shortly afterwards. As the trio went back to the tarmac and onto the final climb of the Passo del Lume Spento, De Bondt was dropped from the front while Covi and Schmid worked together to build their gap over their breakaway companions. The duo would contest the sprint for the stage win, with Schmid outsprinting Covi to take his first professional win.

Meanwhile, in the maglia rosa group, Filippo Ganna increased the pace on the first sector, causing splits in the group. Remco Evenepoel, Aleksandr Vlasov, Simon Yates, Hugh Carthy, and Emanuel Buchmann soon found themselves around 30 seconds behind the Ineos-led front group but they would eventually latch on back just ahead of the second sector. Amidst the chaos in the favourites' group, two riders who started the day in the top ten of the GC, Dan Martin and Davide Formolo were definitively distanced on the first sector, with both riders dropping out of contention by the day's end. On the second sector, the group would remain relatively intact before the  duo of George Bennett and Tobias Foss attacked near the top of the steep section of the climb. The duo had a gap of around 30 seconds before the  brought them back as they approached the third sector.

On the third sector, the  continued to lead the maglia rosa group, but at the back of the group, Evenepoel was beginning to lose contact. Sensing the opportunity to distance his closest rival at this point, Egan Bernal pressed on the pace. It took a while for João Almeida to drop back and assist his teammate, but by this time, Evenepoel was almost a minute down on the Bernal group. Evenepoel was visibly uncomfortable on the gravel and he would eventually lose two minutes on the day. As the main group of favourites reached the tarmac at the end of the last sector, Giulio Ciccone made the first acceleration, but he was immediately caught and dropped. Buchmann was the next to attack from the maglia rosa group, putting on a sustained acceleration to maintain his gap. As the maglia rosa group began to splinter, Carthy briefly accelerated before Vlasov made a bigger acceleration. However, Bernal immediately stuck to the latter's wheel before producing a counter-attack to drop the rest of the group. Bernal worked together with Buchmann to increase their advantage before the former dropped the latter on the final 200-metre ramp to the line. All of the other favourites crossed the line in drips and drabs from behind.

In terms of the battle for the maglia rosa, Bernal increased his advantage to 45 seconds over Vlasov, who rose to second overall, with no other rider within a minute of Bernal's lead. Damiano Caruso rose to third overall at 1' 12" behind Bernal. As a result of his efforts, Buchmann rose to sixth overall, while Foss and Daniel Martinez climbed into the top ten. As for those who lost time on the stage, Evenepoel dropped to seventh overall at almost two and a half minutes behind Bernal, while Ciccone dropped to eighth, having lost almost two minutes on the day. However, the biggest of these losers were Martin and Formolo, who both finished more than six minutes behind Bernal.

References

Sources

External links 

2021 Giro d'Italia
Giro d'Italia stages